The Liberty League is an intercollegiate athletic conference affiliated with the National Collegiate Athletic Association's (NCAA) Division III. Member schools are top institutions that are all located in the state of New York.

History

It was founded in 1995 as the Upstate Collegiate Athletic Association. The conference was renamed during the summer of 2004 to the current name.

The league includes founding members Clarkson University, Hobart and William Smith Colleges, the University of Rochester, Rensselaer Polytechnic Institute, St. Lawrence University, Skidmore College, and Union College. Vassar College became a full member of the league during the 2000–01 academic year, Bard College and Rochester Institute of Technology joined for the 2011–12 academic year, and Ithaca College officially joined for the 2017–18 academic year. Founding member Hamilton College departed following the 2010–11 academic year in order to fully integrate its athletic programs within the New England Small College Athletic Conference (NESCAC).

The United States Merchant Marine Academy, Worcester Polytechnic Institute and Springfield College are associate members in football only.

At the beginning of the 2012–13 season, New York University became an associate member in both men's and women's golf, while Wellesley College and Mount Holyoke College became associate members in women's golf.

Accomplishments
Offensive linesman Ali Marpet of Hobart and William Smith Colleges, drafted in the 2nd round, 61st overall, of the 2015 NFL draft, is the highest-drafted pick in the history of Division III football.  He was three-time All-Liberty League first team (2012, 2013, 2014), and 2014 Liberty League Co-Offensive Player of the Year—the first offensive lineman in league history to be so honored.

Chronological timeline
 1995 – In 1995, the Liberty League was founded as the Upstate Collegiate Athletic Association (UCAA). Charter members included Clarkson University, Hobart and William Smith Colleges, the University of Rochester, Rensselaer Polytechnic Institute (RPI), St. Lawrence University, Skidmore College and Union College, effective beginning the 1995–96 academic year.
 2001 – Vassar College joined the UCAA, effective in the 2000–01 academic year.
 2004 – On July 1, 2004, the UCAA has been rebranded as the Liberty League; effective in the 2004–05 academic year.
 2004 – The United States Coast Guard Academy (Coast Guard), the United States Merchant Marine Academy (Merchant Marine) and Worcester Polytechnic Institute (WPI) joined the Liberty League as associate members for football, effective in the 2004 fall season (2004–05 academic year).
 2006 – U.S. Coast Guard left the Liberty League as an associate member for football, effective after the 2005 fall season (2005–06 academic year).
 2007 – Susquehanna University joined the Liberty League as an associate member for football, effective in the 2007 fall season (2007–08 academic year).
 2009 – U.S. Merchant Marine added men's golf to its Liberty League associate membership, effective in the 2010 spring season (2009–10 academic year).
 2010 – Susquehanna left the Liberty League as an associate member for football, effective after the 2009 fall season (2009–10 academic year).
 2011 – Founding member Hamilton College left the Liberty League in order to fully integrate its athletic programs within the New England Small College Athletic Conference (NESCAC), effective after the 2010–11 academic year.
 2011 – Bard College and Rochester Institute of Technology (RIT) joined the Liberty League, effective in the 2011–12 academic year. 
 2012 – U.S. Merchant Marine left the Liberty League as an associate member for men's golf after dropping the sport, effective after the 2012 spring season (2011–12 academic year).
 2012 – Four institutions joined the Liberty League as associate members: Springfield College for football, New York University for both men's and women's golf, and Wellesley College and Mount Holyoke College for women's golf, all effective in the 2012–13 academic year.
 2013 – St. John Fisher College joined the Liberty League as an associate member for men's and women's rowing, effective in the 2013–14 academic year.
 2017 – Springfield, U.S. Merchant Marine and Worcester Poly (WPI) left the Liberty League as associate members for football, effective after the 2016 fall season (2016–17 academic year).
 2017 – Ithaca College joined the Liberty League, effective in the 2017–18 academic year.
 2019 – Buffalo State College joined the Liberty League as an associate member for football, effective in the 2019 fall season (2019–20 academic year).
 2020 – Mount Holyoke left the Liberty League as an associate member for women's golf after dropping the sport, effective after the 2020 spring season (2019–20 academic year).

Member schools

Current members
The Liberty League currently has 12 full members, all are private schools:

Notes

Associate members
The Liberty League currently has four associate members, all but one are private schools:

Former members
The Liberty League had one former full member, which was also a private school:

Notes

Former associate members
The Liberty League had six former associate members, all but two were private schools:

Notes

Membership timeline

Sports

The Liberty League sponsors intercollegiate athletic competition in men's baseball, men's and women's basketball, men's and women's crew, men's and women's cross country, women's field hockey, men's football, men's golf, men's and women's lacrosse, men's and women’s soccer, women's softball, men's and women's squash, men's and women's swimming and diving, men's and women's tennis, men's and women's track and field, and women's volleyball.

References

External links